Adelina Adalis (26 July 1900 – 13 August 1969) was a Soviet poet, prose writer and translator.

Alongside Valery Bryusov (1873–1924) and Nikolay Gumilev (1886–1921), she influenced Malaysian literature in the 19th and 20th century.

References

Bibliography
 

1900 births
1969 deaths
Women biographers
20th-century biographers
Russian biographers
Translators from Azerbaijani
Russian speculative fiction writers
20th-century Russian poets
Soviet speculative fiction writers
Pseudonymous women writers
20th-century Russian women writers
20th-century Russian translators
20th-century pseudonymous writers